Lewisburg Historic District in Covington, Kentucky, United States, is a  historic district that was listed on the National Register of Historic Places in 1993.  At that time, it included 430 buildings deemed to contribute to the historic character of the area, and 46 non-contributing buildings.  It is bounded by Interstate 75 on the east and city limits on the southwest and west.

References

National Register of Historic Places in Kenton County, Kentucky
Victorian architecture in Kentucky
Greek Revival architecture in Kentucky
Geography of Kenton County, Kentucky
Historic districts on the National Register of Historic Places in Kentucky
Buildings and structures in Covington, Kentucky